Tendring Hundred Show is an annual agricultural fair held in early July at the Showground at Lawford House Park, near Manningtree in Essex, England, featuring over 200 tradestands and entertainment in several show areas, established in 1899. The details of the show may vary from one year to the next.

There was no show in 1915–18, 1930–36, 1940–45 & since 2020.

Entertainment
 Heavy horse classes
 Vintage car parade
 Heart of England falconry Display 
 Scurry
 Hound parade 
 Young Farmers' tug-of-war
 Team Spectrum kite display 
 Krag Dancers from Poland

Show areas
 Countryside Area – arena including terrier racing, gun dog and falconry displays, fly fishing on a small artificial pond, archery and shooting demonstrations, and numerous societies representing all sorts of rural organizations from badgers and bees to the 10m Living River, with varieties of fresh water coarse fish native to UK rivers.
 Community Area – each year one local community shows a diverse range of groups exhibiting and performing on the stage.
 Flower Tent - concentrating on flower clubs, local horticultural societies and garden clubs, both displaying and exhibiting. There are experts on hand to give help and advice on all aspects of gardening as well as local nurseries displaying and selling items for home gardeners. 
 Education Area - Over 40 schools displaying their work as well as student performances throughout the day.
 Children's Activity Area - featuring Professor Poppycock and his Punch & Judy, the Essex Storytellers, and bouncy castles.
 Craft Tent and Shoppers Market – with unique gifts and handicrafts for sale.
 Food Hall – incorporates a farmers' market, and several vendors selling food and beverages.
 Art Show - in which local artists display works for sale

Animal shows
 Poultry Show – the largest show of its kind in the area with over 100 classes for all types of fowl.
 Goat Show – many different breeds of goat
 Rabbit Show – a Two Star Show with over 100 exhibits
 Cavy (Guinea Pig) Show - wide range of breeds and varieties, including some rare breeds. 
 Rat Show – Summer Cup show run by the National Fancy Rat Society
 Pigeon Show – a long established show exhibiting 45 breeds of fancy pigeons
 Horse Show - With three rings in the dedicated horse area with a mix of ridden and in-hand classes for horses and ponies including the BSJA Show jumping arena, with affiliated show jumping throughout the day.

External references
BBC Article
Show Website

Agricultural shows in England
Annual fairs
Events in Essex
Fairs in England
July events